Angelika Aukenthaler (born 7 August 1961) is an Italian luger. She competed in the women's singles event at the 1980 Winter Olympics.

References

External links
 

1961 births
Living people
Italian female lugers
Olympic lugers of Italy
Lugers at the 1980 Winter Olympics
Sportspeople from Sterzing